Tony Lawson (born 17 February 1972) is an Australian diver. He competed in the men's 10 metre platform event at the 1996 Summer Olympics.

References

External links
 

1972 births
Living people
Australian male divers
Olympic divers of Australia
Divers at the 1996 Summer Olympics
Sportspeople from Newcastle, New South Wales
20th-century Australian people
21st-century Australian people